Nagia promota is a species of moth in the family Erebidae, this species occurs in Madagascar.

This species has a wingspan of 35 mm.

References

Nagia
Moths of Madagascar
Moths of Africa
Moths described in 1907